Russians in Armenia  are ethnic Russians living in Armenia, where they make up the second largest minority (after the Yazidis).  In the 2022 census, there were 109,000 Russians counted, making up nearly 3.6% of the whole population of Armenia.

History
The first mass-immigration of  Russians into Armenia occurred in the late 18th century when Molokans, a break-off sect of the Russian Orthodox Church, were deported to Amasya and Sevan, with some 5000 of their descendants still living in the country.

After the Russo-Turkish war of 1828-1829 many Russians immigrated to Russian Armenia, establishing businesses and churches, and settling throughout mountainous northwest of the country. During Soviet period much more Russians immigrated into Armenian SSR and were engaged in the industry and clerical work. Outward migration of Russians increased after 1990, during the Dissolution of the Soviet Union, when economic conditions harshly deteriorated and Armenian became the official language of the country.

Traditional Russian villages can still be found in Amassia, Ashotsk (Shirak), Sevan and Semyonvka (Gegharkunik Province), Filoetovo, Lermontov, Pushkino, Sverdlov, Lernantsk, Medovka, Lerhovit, Petrovka, Tashir and Mikaielovska (Lori Province).

Immigration following 2022 Russian invasion of Ukraine 
Following the 2022 Russian invasion of Ukraine, a significant number of Russians (particularly within the IT sector) left for Armenia, primarily due to sanctions and a crackdown on dissent to the war. A majority of them settled within the cities of Yerevan and Gyumri, unintentionally causing a spike in local property prices. For example, Armenian apartments for sale cost much more in 2022 than they did in 2021. The cost of apartments in the city's center increased by an average of 109,000 drams during the course of a year (about 273 Euros). A further wave of Russians left for Armenia in September and October due to the mobilization of Russian citizens later into the war.

Russian churches in Armenia

Amrakits
Saint Nikolai the Wonderworker's Church, opened in 1848.

Gyumri
Saint Alexandra the Martyr's Church, opened in 1837.
Saint Michael the Archangel's Church, opened in 1880.
Saint Arsenije Church of, opened in 1910.

Vanadzor
Church of the Nativity of Blessed Virgin Mary, opened in 1895.

Yerevan

Church of the Intercession of the Holy Mother of God, opened in 1916.
Holy Cross Church, opened in 2017.

Demolished churches
Russian church of the Seversky 18th Dragoon Regiment, built in 1856 in Gyumri. It was consecrated in 1901 and destroyed during the Soviet days.
Russian church of the Caucasian 7th Rifle Regiment, built during the 1850s in Gyumri. It was destroyed during the Soviet days.
Russian church of the Caucasian 8th Rifle Regiment, built during the 1850s in Gyumri. It was destroyed during the Soviet days.
Russian church of the Baku 154th Infantry Regiment, built during the 1850s in Gyumri. It was destroyed during the Soviet days.
Saint Nikolai Cathedral, Yerevan, built in the 2nd half of the 19th century and destroyed in 1931.

See also
Ethnic minorities in Armenia
Place name changes in Armenia
Russian Armenia
 Armenians in Russia
 Armenian-Russian relations
Russians in post-Soviet states
Russian diaspora

References

Ethnic groups in Armenia
 
Armenia–Russia relations
Eastern Orthodoxy in Armenia